Ryan Max Riley (born May 15, 1979) is a humorist and athlete who was a humor writer for The Harvard Lampoon. He competed on the World Cup for seven years and was a two-time US National Champion as an athlete on the U.S. Ski Team in the freestyle skiing events of moguls and dual moguls.  He graduated with a bachelor's degree from Harvard College and earned master's degrees from the University of Oxford and Yale University.

Biography
Riley grew up in Colorado, graduating in 1997 from the Lowell Whiteman School in Steamboat Springs and training on the freestyle teams at Winter Park Resort and the Steamboat Springs Winter Sports Club, both of which have produced many  U.S. Ski Team athletes and winter Olympians.  

In his last three years on the U.S. Ski Team, Riley attended Harvard University, where he was a humor writer for The Harvard Lampoon.  After finishing his A.B. with high honors in Literature at Harvard University in 2007, he earned an M.St. with distinction and won the Gerard Davis Prize for the best dissertation on a topic in French literary studies submitted for the M.St. in Medieval and Modern Languages from the University of Oxford in 2011 (he was in the Queen's College). He then completed his M.A. in French Literature at Yale University.

According to his Yale biography, Riley has a pet polish dwarf rabbit named Thibault after a character (Tybalt) in William Shakespeare's play Romeo and Juliet and the pet lobster of the French poet Gérard de Nerval, a pet lobster that Nerval used to walk around Paris with a blue ribbon.

Writing
While in college, Riley was a humor writer for The Harvard Lampoon, a humor magazine and humor society founded in 1876 at Harvard University. He now writes comedy for publications such as CollegeHumor, Splitsider (the humor website of The Awl), The Higgs Weldon, The Big Jewel, and FunnyTweets. His first novel is forthcoming.

United States Ski Team

Riley earned a spot on the U.S. Ski Team in 1998, when he won the overall Nor-Am Cup in Moguls.  On March 14, 1998, he competed in his first World Cup, in Altenmarkt-Zauchensee, Austria, and placed 14th.  He got his first top-5 result on the World Cup the next season, finishing fifth in Dual Moguls in Madarao, Japan, on February 21, 1999 (he placed sixth the day before in Moguls).  A week later, he won the silver medal at the Junior World Championships in Jyvaskyla, Finland.  

Riley placed second in a World Cup in 2001 and won silver and bronze medals at the Goodwill Games in 2000.

He won his second U.S. National Championship with one of the highest scores in the history of the sport (a 28.55) in Moguls in 2001 in Waterville Valley, New Hampshire.  

In 2000, he was featured in the Warren Miller film Ride.

References

External links
 
 Riley's humor writing on CollegeHumor
 Riley's humor writing on The Higgs Weldon
 Riley's jokes on FunnyTweets
 U.S. Championships 2001 (Moguls)
 U.S. Championships 1999 (Dual Moguls)
 Goodwill Games 2000 (Dual Moguls)
 Goodwill Games 2000 (Moguls)
 
 Yale University student biography
 Yale University Trumbull College graduate affiliate biography

The Harvard Lampoon alumni
American male freestyle skiers
Place of birth missing (living people)
American freeskiers
1979 births
Living people
Yale University alumni
Harvard College alumni
Alumni of The Queen's College, Oxford